Dance with Valentino is a dance reality -talk show hosted by Valentino Richard Kabenge, a Ugandan Latin and Ballroom dancer and actor.  The show premiered on NTV Uganda on November 15, 2020. Guests have an in-depth interview about an unforgettable memory or event that has taken place in their life. The challenge for the professional dance team is to choreograph that story into a dance. The challenge for the guest is to then perform within that choreographed dance, to find a sense of healing at the end. The show also creates awareness around social issues such as domestic violence, depression, heartbreak, loss and rejection etcetera through these  special performances.

Production and filming
Valentino Richard Kabenge initially created the concept of 'Dance With Valentino' in 2016 and since then its form has been evolving. In April 2020, during his media run to promote Winnie Nwagi's 'Jangu' music a video, he appeared on NTV Mwasuze Mutya, hosted by Faridah Nakazibwe. Both were a springboard to conversations with Zena Bernacca, a life-long dancer herself and organisational development consultant, coach and mentor, and together through ValRich Arts, they have brought the ‘Dance With Valentino’ show to life.

Work on the show started as early as May 2020. In August 2020, Talent Africa was contracted by ValRich Arts to come on board as the Production House partner. It is being aired by NTV having launched on November 15, 2020.

The theme song was written by James Asiimwe, produced by Big Nash and performed by singers Daniel Kawesa and Essie.

Cast

References

External links

 

2020 Ugandan television series debuts
2020s Ugandan television series
Ugandan reality television series
NTV Uganda original programming